Jook-sing or zuk-sing (竹升) is a Cantonese term for an overseas Chinese person who was born in a Western environment or a Chinese person who more readily or strongly identifies with Western culture than traditional Chinese culture.

Etymology 
The term jook-sing evolved from zuk-gong (竹杠; zhugang in Mandarin) which means a "bamboo pole" or "rod".  Since gong (杠) is a Cantonese homophone of the inauspicious word 降 which means "descend" or "downward", it is replaced with sing (升), which means "ascend" or "upward".

The stem of the bamboo plant is hollow and compartmentalized; thus water poured in one end does not flow out of the other end. The metaphor is that jook-sings are not part of either culture; water within the jook-sing does not flow and connect to either end.  The term may or may not be derogatory. Use of the term predates World War II.

Modern term

North American usage
In the United States and Canada, the term is pejorative and refers to fully Westernized American-born or Canadian-born Chinese. The term originates from Cantonese slang in the United States. Jook-sing persons are categorized as having Western-centric identities, values and culture. The term also refers to similar Chinese individuals in Australia, Malaysia, Singapore, and New Zealand.

Related colloquialisms
Banana (referencing the yellow skin and white insides of the fruit when fully matured) and Twinkie (based on the snack produced by American company Hostess - again, it denotes something that is "yellow" on the outside and "white" on the inside); may be used as a pejorative term or as a non-pejorative term.
FOB (Fresh Off the Boat): antonym of jook-sing. Typically meant to indicate a Chinese-born person who propagates excessively Chinese stereotypes while living in the West.

See also

 Lost Years: A People's Struggle for Justice

 Overseas ChineseAmerican ChineseBritish ChineseChinese CanadianChinese AustralianChinese New Zealander

 American-born Chinese
 Third culture kid

References

Bibliography

External links

 Pilgrimage to China by Beth Boswell Jacks
 Lost Years
 Strained Relations by Julie D. Soo

Cantonese words and phrases
Chinese diaspora
Ethnic and religious slurs